Yama Dharmaraja Temple is a Hindu temple located at Thiruchitrambalam in the Thanjavur district of Tamil Nadu, India. The temple is dedicated to Yama.

Shrines 

The presiding deity is Yama, the Hindu god of death. There are also shrines to Veeranar, Rakkachi, Muthumani, Karuppu Sami, Kombukkaran and Vaduvachi. There are also idols of Chitragupta, Pambatti Siddhar, Ayyanar and his consorts Purna and Pushkala.

Mythology 

According to Hindu mythology, Manmatha the Hindu Cupid provoked the ire of Shiva and was burnt to death. The Puradhana Vaneswarar Temple in neighboring Peravurani lies on the spot where the alleged incident took place. However, on Yama's request, Manmatha was restored to life. The Yama Dharmaraja Temple is believed to have been built at the spot where he was restored to life.

Significance 

The temple is one of the few dedicated to Yama.

References 

 

 Hindu temples in Thanjavur district